Light the Universe is a song and a single made by the German power metal band Helloween from their album Keeper of the Seven Keys - The Legacy.
It features Candice Night from Blackmore's Night as co-vocalist. Light The Universe (Andi Deris version) is exclusive track for the Japanese version of the single.

Track list

Personnel
 Andi Deris - vocals
 Michael Weikath - lead guitar
 Sascha Gerstner - rhythm guitar
 Markus Grosskopf - bass
 Daniel Loeble - drums 
 Candice Night - female vocals on "Light the Universe"

References

2005 songs
2006 singles
Helloween songs
Heavy metal ballads
Songs written by Andi Deris